Sam Ellis Haddon (born June 19, 1937) is an American attorney and jurist serving as a senior United States district judge of the United States District Court for the District of Montana.

Early life and education 

Born in West Monroe, Louisiana, Haddon received a Bachelor of Science from Rice University in 1959 and a Juris Doctor from the University of Montana School of Law in 1965.

Career 
Haddon was an Immigration Patrol Inspector, United States Border Patrol from 1959–1961. He was an Agent with the Federal Bureau of Narcotics from 1961–1962. He was in private practice in Montana from 1966–2001. Since 1971 he has been an adjunct instructor at the University of Montana School of Law.

Federal judicial service 
Haddon is a senior United States District Judge for the United States District Court for the District of Montana. Haddon was nominated by President George W. Bush on May 17, 2001, to a seat vacated by Charles C. Lovell. He was confirmed by the United States Senate on July 20, 2001, and received his commission on July 25, 2001. He took senior status on December 31, 2012. As of 2020, he is the last judge appointed by a Republican president to the District of Montana.

External links

1937 births
Living people
21st-century American judges
Judges of the United States District Court for the District of Montana
Rice University alumni
United States Border Patrol agents
United States district court judges appointed by George W. Bush
University of Montana alumni
University of Montana faculty